Heterochromis is a genus of cichlid fish in the order Perciformes. It is the  only genus of the subfamily Heterochromidinae, and contains a single species, Heterochromis multidens, which is endemic to the Congo River Basin in Central Africa. The relationships of Heterochromis to other cichlids have long been controversial, with several morphological features suggesting that it is more closely related to American cichlids than to other African species. Molecular studies have given contradictory results. The most comprehensive analysis done to date found more support for relationship to African cichlids, but could not conclusively reject a relationship to the American clade. 

This species is probably a substrate spawner and in older males a hump may develop on the head.

References 

 

Cichlid fish of Africa
Fish described in 1900
Monotypic ray-finned fish genera
Monotypic freshwater fish genera
Cichlid genera
Taxa named by Charles Tate Regan
Cichlidae